Attorney General Van Buren may refer to:

John Van Buren (1810–1866), Attorney General of New York
Martin Van Buren (1782–1862), Attorney General of New York